Norbert Friedrich Haug (born 24 November 1952) is a German journalist and the former vice president of Mercedes-Benz motorsport activity, including Formula One, Formula 3 and DTM. Under his direction, Mercedes-Benz enjoyed considerable success in all categories, winning multiple races and championships.

Journalist
Haug worked for the Pforzheimer Zeitung newspaper in his home town of Pforzheim as a volunteer, before joining them as a trainee journalist. He then moved on to the publishing house Motor-Presse-Verlag in Stuttgart, which was part of the Gruner + Jahr group, where he became head of motorsports for Auto, Motor und Sport magazine before becoming its deputy chief editor in 1988.

While busy pursuing a career in journalism, Haug also raced cars, including the 24 Hours Nürburgring where he finished second in 1985. He also took part, like many people involved with Formula One, in the Porsche Carrera Cup. In 1986, was given the opportunity to privately test a Williams F1 car.

Mercedes-Benz

Haug joined Mercedes-Benz in 1990, with a brief to revive their motor sport credentials. Haug maintained Mercedes presence in Group C and later in the DTM and International Touring Car Championship. Early successes included Klaus Ludwig winning the DTM drivers title in 1992 and 1994, and Bernd Schneider winning both the DTM and ITC drivers titles in 1995. In 2000 Haug and Mercedes were instrumental in the relaunch of Deutsche Tourenwagen Masters.

Formula One
Under Haug's direction, Mercedes-Benz re-entered Formula One after almost 40 years. In 1993 Haug negotiated a partnership with Peter Sauber, with engineering assistance which resulted in Sauber team cars having the words Concept by Mercedes-Benz on their engine bay flanks. In 1994 Haug negotiated Mercedes-Benz entry to the CART championship, and the Sauber-Mercedes cars were now officially powered by Mercedes-Benz badged engines, developed by the company's development arrangement with United Kingdom based manufacturer Ilmor.

After the serious accident at the Monaco Grand Prix which resulted in injury to Karl Wendlinger, and with Team McLaren looking for a new engine supplier, Haug negotiated Mercedes-Benz partnership with McLaren from the 1995 season. In 2009, it was officially announced that Daimler AG in partnership with Aabar Investments had purchased a 75.1% stake in Brawn GP (Daimler AG: 45.1%; Aabar: 30%). The team used the Brawn GP base in Brackley for its operations and Brawn stayed on as team principal until the end of the  season. On 13 December 2012, it was announced that Haug would leave his role and the company at the end of 2012.

Personal life
Haug is married, with one daughter.

References

External links

1952 births
Living people
People from Pforzheim
German journalists
German male journalists
20th-century German journalists
21st-century German journalists
German motorsport people
Formula One people
World Sportscar Championship drivers
German male writers
Mercedes-Benz in Formula One